Envenomed is the seventh studio album by Florida death metal band Malevolent Creation. It's also released a Re-issue album entitled Envenomed II.

Track listing

Personnel
 Brett Hoffmann - Vocals
 Rob Barrett - Lead guitar
 Phil Fasciana - Rhythm guitar
 Gordon Simms - Bass
 Dave Culross - Drums

Malevolent Creation albums
2000 albums
Albums produced by Jeremy Staska